Voskresenskoye is an urban locality (a work settlement) and the administrative center of Voskresensky District of Nizhny Novgorod Oblast, Russia, on the Vetluga River. Population:

References

Urban-type settlements in Nizhny Novgorod Oblast
Voskresensky District, Nizhny Novgorod Oblast
Makaryevsky Uyezd (Nizhny Novgorod Governorate)